Yindaw Ma Lay (1846 –  1916) was a Burmese royal court dancer, best known during the late Konbaung era. Yindaw Ma Lay is said to be one of the two mothers of the Mandalay's first dramatic arts era along with Sin Kho Ma Lay, her only contemporary court dancer.

Early life
Yindaw Ma Lay was born in 1846 at Yindaw. In 1862, she was sent to Mandalay, by the mayor of Yindaw, to serve as a royal anyeint preliminary dancer.

Career as a royal dancer

She became a leading court dancer a year later, playing the role of Putzabar princess in Indrāvudha court drama together with Eenaung Mg San Toke. She soon became popular in the royal society. She received the appanage of Yindaw and was hence known as Yindaw Ma Lay (or Duchess of Yindaw).

In 1868, the Indrāvudha court drama team led by Yindaw Ma Lay was sent on a mission to perform the royal court drama for the governor-general Lord Mayo's Yangon tour for the request of Pegu commissioner.

Later life
After the abdication of King Thibaw in 1885, since there were no major contributors, the Indrāvudha court drama troupe was almost disbanded. However, because the wife of Taunggwin mayor supported them, it could perform at the ceremonies held in Mandalay.

Eight years after the abdication of King Thibaw, Yindaw Ma Lay went blind one eye. She remained poorly at her sixties. Although getting her age, she had participated in some local dance troupes. Whenever she sung about the fall of her time of glory to becoming lower status, all the audience felt sad for her.

No one in her generation inherited Yindaw Ma Lay's knowledge of Burmese royal dance, except Ma Htwe Lay, her pupil, who later became a popular dancer.

Notes

See also
 Burmese dance
 Anyeint
 Aung Bala
 Awba Thaung
 Liberty Ma Mya Yin
 Mya Chay Gyin Ma Ngwe Myaing

References

1846 births
1916 deaths
Burmese dancers